The Santa Lucia Preserve or The Preserve (formerly Rancho San Carlos) is a private,  gated development permitting 297  homesites. It is located in the foothills of the Santa Lucia Range between Palo Corona Regional Park and Carmel Valley, California. It contains most of the watershed of Las Garzas Creek, a tributary of the Carmel River.

Developers Peter Stocker and Tom Gray formed the Rancho San Carlos Partnership which purchased the property from Arthur Oppenheimer in 1990 for $70 million. After resolving disputes and lawsuits with environmentalists and activists, The Preserve Company and the Conservancy submitted a modified design that met their approval.

The Partnership established The Preserve as a conservation community, protecting 90% of the  property in perpetuity through the Santa Lucia Conservancy, a conservation land trust.

The remaining 10% intended for development is separately owned and operated by The Santa Lucia Preserve Company. The land features 297 homesites, employee housing, an existing Spanish-style hacienda dating to the 1920s, an equestrian center, a small store, a private 365-acre golf course designed by Tom Fazio, and other recreational facilities. The partnership's initial investment was around $200 million. The property is now worth an estimated $500 million. A stone gatehouse on Rancho San Carlos Road controls who can access the preserve. Only homeowners, their families and guests, and staff are permitted on the property.

The property has been used as a shooting location for film, television, and commercials. The inactive Sid Ormsbee Fire Lookout, visible throughout Carmel Valley and The Preserve, is located on the property.

History

Native American and Pioneer era 

The land was first settled by the Rumsen Ohlone Native Americans. A Rumsen village known as Echilat was located within the present-day Santa Lucia Preserve. Four prehistoric resource sites were identified within the Preserve, including midden sites containing shell (mussel, chiton and barnacle); lithics (chert, andesite and quartz); fire-altered rock; animal bone; and dark soil. Dark patches in the soil indicate where they cooked acorn patties on hot coals.

The Spanish arrived in the 1770s and established the Presidio of Monterey and the Carmel Mission, creating Alta California. The Rumsen people were devastated by diseases they had no resistance to. The survivors were forcibly incorporated into the colony as neophytes and laborers. When the California Mission System was secularized by the Mexican government in August 1833, the former mission lands in the area of the present-day property were divided into two grants. Rancho Potrero de San Carlos was given to Fructuoso del Real, a Mission Indian. Rancho San Francisquito was granted in 1835 to Dona Catalina Manzanellide Muñras.

The ranchos were each bought and sold over the years. Businessman Bradley Sargent bought the two ranchos in 1876 and renamed them San Francisquito y San Carlos. During Sargent's ownership, author Robert Louis Stevenson fell ill while on a camping trip and was nursed back to health in a cabin on the property, the ruins of which remain today. Sargent’s brother managed the land as a cattle ranch.

Estate development 

George Gordon Moore, born in Ontario, Canada in 1875, became a lawyer and later  president of the Michigan United Traction Company. He also owned public utilities in Georgia, Nebraska, Canada and Brazil. He built a horsebreeding farm in St. Clair, Michigan  and a game preserve in North Carolina.

Moore was a millionaire by the mid-1920s. While visiting Monterey he bought the land and renamed it Rancho San Carlos. He had nine Russian sows and three boars sent from his game preserve in North Carolina for sport hunting which have now spread to all but two of California's 58 counties.

Moore spent lavishly to entertain his guests at extravagant parties attended by Hollywood starlets. He became a socialite and friend of newspaper magnate William Randolph Hearst. He built a secret door to the wine cellar so it could be concealed from authorities during Prohibition. Moore entertained a who's who of Hollywood celebrities and the social elite, including W. Averell Harriman, Lady Alexandra Curzon, Tommy Hitchcock Jr., William Tevis, a colorful character who played polo for over sixty years, and Eric Leader Pedley.

Financial losses suffered during the market crash and Great Depression eventually forced Moore into  foreclosure in 1939.

Arthur C. Oppenheimer, a businessman from San Francisco who owned the Rosenberg Fruit Company and longed to become a rancher, bought the land. Under the management of his friend, George King, the property was returned once again to a working ranch, and for the next 45 years was well known for raising quality beef. Although Oppenheimer longed to become a rancher, he and his family did not live there. Instead they used it as a family retreat for half a century.

Modern development 

In 1990 the property was purchased by the Rancho San Carlos Partnership (RSCP) from the Oppenheimer family for $70 million. The Partnership’s two general partners were A Plus Co., Ltd., a Japanese finance company associated with Sanwa Bank, and Las Garzas Associates Limited Partnership, associated with Pacific Union Co, a San Francisco-based real estate development and management corporation. Co-founder Peter Stocker was killed in a helicopter crash on the property which left completion of the project to his business partner Tom Gray.

The Santa Lucia Preserve Company 

After purchasing the property for $70 million, RSCP engaged in a lengthy process of planning development. Their initial submitted plan set aside  for 300 home sites, 50 employee housing units, a 150-room lodge, a golf course, equestrian center, sports club, tennis courts, and a village center with a general store, gas station, and post office. This compares to an 11,000-unit development that the Oppenheimer family had considered and rejected in 1965.

Early criticism 

When the initial development plan was revealed by RSCP, it encountered considerable suspicion. Some locals protested, petitioned, and sued in an effort to stop the project, with legal support from the Ventana Chapter of Sierra Club. Besides concern that the development was a conservation project in name only—a marketing ploy known as green-washing—some of their specific concerns were that The Preserve would increase local traffic, strain scarce water resources, worsen air quality, and that developers were planning far more development than they were declaring publicly.

The Sierra Club lawsuit (Sierra Club, et al. v. County of Monterey, et al.) successfully placed Measure M on the November 5, 1996 Monterey County ballot. It barred RSCP from building the 150-room lodge and a larger shopping area on the property.

The Big Sur Land Trust paid for an analysis of the company's plans. Andy Johnson, president of Conservation Advisors, commented that "They’re quite unusual... [Most] developers are out to max out the property. I think they [RSCP] have in their approach the understanding of the importance of maintaining the quality of the environment they’ve acquired. They are really doing more than their share to come up with a unique solution." The developers submitted a modified plan that was eventually supported by conservationists and local officials.

Return on investment 

Thomas Gray, Managing Partner of Las Garzas Association, the development and achievement partner of RSCP and President of Pacific Union Properties, estimated that the final investment would be "on the order of $200 million." RSCP hired a former employee of the Monterey County Planning Department as a consultant to manage their development efforts with the county. They also hired Jeff Froke, a wildland ecologist who was previously Associate Director of Sanctuaries for the National Audubon Society, as their Natural Resource Manager.

Sales have confirmed that price range. The acreage provides privacy and insulates neighbors from one another. , an undeveloped  lot was listed for $950,000. Buyers must build a home in keeping with strict site-specific guidelines and other restrictions on size, location, and other factors. They may only alter the landscape within an approximately  "housing envelope" on their parcel. HOA fees are more than $1,000 per month. A report in the local Monterey County Weekly estimated that the entire property's value was in excess of $500 million. The main room of the 37-room Spanish Colonial Hacienda  built by Moore was converted to a private inn for preserve members, families, and guests. The original polo stable was restored and  a modern swimming pool with a two-story slide was built alongside it. The hay barn was converted to a social hall with a dance floor and antique bar.

Management 

The logos and overall brands for both organizations were designed by American graphic designer Michael Patrick Cronan. The strict style guide for homes and the design of a golf clubhouse and numerous recreational facilities were created by architectural firm Hart Howerton. In 2018, an illustrated volume on the history of Rancho San Carlos was published in collaboration with historian Mark Hugh Miller.

Santa Lucia Conservancy 

Conservation at The Preserve is managed by the Santa Lucia Conservancy, a 501(c)(3) non-profit land trust, established with oversight and legal input from the Trust for Public Land. The Santa Lucia Conservancy has a two-part mission: to protect, enhance, and restore the lands of The Santa Lucia Preserve while promoting ecologically sustainable development. As such, it falls under the IUCN's Category V protected area designation. In partnership with local universities, the Conservancy maintains an ongoing internship program for students looking for field experience in conservation land management and ecology.

In 2018, the Conservancy partnered with the Trust for Public Land and regional conservation organizations to acquire  of the Carmel River watershed. A large portion of this land was incorporated into Palo Corona Regional Park, while the Conservancy acquired  to use for offices and operations.

Environmental impact 

The Santa Lucia Preserve contributes water to the Carmel Valley Alluvial Aquifer which is the major source of Monterey Peninsula's potable water. Four major streams flow through The Preserve and into the Carmel River: Lower Las Garzas, Portero, San Jose, and San Clemente Creek. All provide habitat for threatened species. Land use and other human influences within The Preserve may affect water quality and quantity in the region. To satisfy monitoring requirements set by the California Environmental Quality Act, the Santa Lucia Conservancy hired The Watershed Institute at California State University Monterey Bay to monitor the river and water quality.

The Conservancy is required to monitor the wildlife found on lands it protects. This included conducting bird and nest counts, locating threatened species such as the California red-legged frog, detecting invasive plants and weeds, and assessing overall grassland health.

To control unwanted species and promote native plant growth, the Conservancy practices conservation grazing. In 2015 the Conservancy hired 1,400 goats that were used to reduce overgrown grasslands that had during prior decades been grazed by native deer and domestic cattle. As a result, the number of threatened California tiger salamander increased.

The Conservancy has sought and received federal funding to pay California State University Monterey Bay graduate students as interns who have conducted research on environmental issues. These projects have focused on surface flow of the Carmel River as well as conservation grazing and avian nest boxes.

Fire impact 

In 2016, the Soberanes Fire burned along The Preserve's southwest border. The property was a critical access point and staging area for firefighters. The fire-fighting efforts were the costliest in US history up to that time.

In 2020, the Conservancy was awarded $2 million in state and federal grants to improve local fire resiliency. In 2021, The Santa Lucia Preserve achieved Firewise Community certification, after extensive efforts between the Santa Lucia Conservancy, Santa Lucia Preserve's Community Services District, and homeowners. Firewise certification (administered by the NFPA, USDA Forest Service, and National Association of State Foresters) recognizes communities that have systematically instituted fuel management plans, use of fire-resistant building materials, strategic placement of structures, and implementation of careful landscaping with ignition-resistant plants.

Preserve Golf Club 

Anyone can purchase memberships in The Preserve Golf Club. A separate recreational "Ranch Club" – providing access to an equestrian center, sports center, and trail system – is available only to Preserve residents and golf club members.  The golf club features a private  Tom Fazio-designed golf course which has been ranked among the top 100 U.S. courses. An annual invitational tournament is held in honor of the late Preserve co-founder, Peter Stocker, who died on the property in the early days of the development.

In 2021, The Preserve Golf Club served as a local qualifying location for the US Open in May, and hosted the California State Amateur Championship in June. In 2022, floating solar and evaporation control panels allowed reduction of the golf course’s power load on the local grid by 80%, the first of its kind in Monterey County.

Sid Ormsbee Lookout 

The tower is visible throughout The Preserve and Carmel Valley. On a clear day, rangers had views stretching from Blue Rock Ridge in the south, to Mount Toro in the north, and Carmel Hill to the west.

It was named for a Sid Ormsbee, a State Forest Ranger who served in World War II and was killed in Italy.

The tower, topped by a 16'x16' octagonal cab, was staffed by alternating seasonal rangers (sometimes with their families) until the 1980’s when it was decommissioned. Since 2012 it has served as a radio relay and cell tower for The Preserve, Cal Fire, Monterey County Regional Fire District, and Monterey County Sheriff’s Department. It was added to the National Historic Lookout Register in 2010. A plaque commemorating its namesake is positioned at the base. The lookout is not accessible to the public.

In popular media

Filming location 

Since at least the 1960s, the property has served as a shooting location for film, television, and commercials, including a 2020 film shot entirely within a Preserve home, notable for being the first to be written and produced entirely during the COVID-19 pandemic while abiding by local safety guidelines and with approval from the Screen Actors Guild.

Character inspiration 

Modern claims that George Gordon Moore inspired the literary character of Jay Gatsby are unproven. Moore assembled a San Carlos Cardinals polo team which featured polo star Tommy Hitchcock Jr., who inspired the character of Tom Buchanan.

See also
 Conservation community
 Land trust

References

External links
 
 Santa Lucia Preserve website
 Santa Lucia Conservancy website
 Santa Lucia Community Services District website
 Maps of The Preserve 
 The Stocker Cup website
 The Santa Lucia Preserve Real Estate Map

1999 establishments in California
Carmel-by-the-Sea, California
Companies based in Monterey County, California
Environmental conservation
Environmental organizations based in California
Forest conservation organizations
Fire lookout towers in California
Geography of Monterey County, California
Golf clubs and courses designed by Tom Fazio
Golf clubs and courses in California
History of Monterey County, California
IUCN Category V
Land trusts in California
Monterey Bay
Monterey County, California
Nature conservation organizations based in the United States
Nature reserves in California
Protected areas of California
Protected areas of Monterey County, California
Santa Lucia Range
Sports venues completed in 2001
Unincorporated communities in Monterey County, California
Conservation communities
Big Sur